This is a list of the Austrian Singles Chart number-one hits of 1992.

See also
1992 in music

References

1992 in Austria
1992 record charts
Lists of number-one songs in Austria